Jose Mejias, better known as Chelo, is an American singer, rapper and choreographer based in Miami Beach, Florida, signed with Sony BMG as a solo artist.  His debut album is 360°, and fuses hip hop, go-go and Latin music. The album is recorded in both English and Spanish.  He is of Puerto Rican descent. His single "Cha Cha" was nominated for two Billboard Latin Music Awards.

Chelo grew up in San Juan, Puerto Rico, the only child of an accountant and a secretary. His father put him in as a guest conga player in his salsa band, and young Chelo also would sing at family events. Chelo was asked by reggaeton star Daddy Yankee to assist him as a choreographer while still in high school, which led to his joining the groups Jyve V and Mexican ATM, which both had songs in the Billboard Latin Top 40.

Cha Cha (2006)
Yummy (2006)
Un Corazón (2007)
Kłamiesz, Kłamałaś (2022)
Dzwoniłaś do partnera (2023)

Discography

Other
Chelo sang at Miss Universe 2006, Zuleyka Rivera's homecoming in Puerto Rico. The song "Cha Cha" is a playable track in the rhythm game Samba De Amigo.

References 

American hip hop musicians
American people of Puerto Rican descent
Living people
Place of birth missing (living people)
Year of birth missing (living people)